The Pointing Finger, also known as No Experience Required is a 1919 American silent drama film, directed by Edward A. Kull and Edward Morrissey. Morrissey began directing the project, but was replaced by Kull in late August or early September 1919. It stars Mary MacLaren, David Butler, and Johnnie Cook, and was released on December 1, 1919. There are no known archival holdings of the film, so it is presumably a lost film.

Cast list
 Mary MacLaren as Mary Murphy
 David Butler as David
 Johnnie Cook as William Saxton
 Carl Stockdale as Grosset
 Lydia Knott as Matron
 Charlotte Woods as Matron's assistant

References

External links 
 
 
 

1919 drama films
1919 films
Silent American drama films
American silent feature films
American black-and-white films
Films directed by Edward A. Kull
Universal Pictures films
1910s English-language films
1910s American films